John Driscoll may refer to:

John Driscoll (jockey), Australian jockey
John Driscoll (sailor), Irish Olympic sailor
Denny Driscoll (1855–1886), American baseball player
Paddy Driscoll (1896–1968), American football quarterback
John R. Driscoll (1924–2014), American politician
John S. Driscoll (1934–2019), American journalist, editor of The Boston Globe
John T. Driscoll (born 1925), American politician
John Driscoll (Montana politician) (born 1946), former Speaker of the Montana House of Representatives
John Driscoll (actor) (born 1981), American actor
John Gerald Driscoll III (1924–2011), yachtsman and businessman

See also
Jack Driscoll (character), a fictional character in the King Kong franchise
Jack Driscoll (American football) (born 1997), American football offensive lineman
John Driscoll Fitz-Gerald (1873–1946), American Hispanic scholar
John O'Driscoll (disambiguation)